Rafael Santos Torroella (1914, in Portbou – 2002, in  Barcelona) was a Spanish art critic, translator and poet.

Biography
Brother of Àngels Santos Torroella, he wrote several books on Joan Miró, Pablo Picasso and Salvador Dalí, among others, and helped renovate the avant-garde art scene in Spain after the Spanish Civil War. Santos published his Antología Poética in 1952. He is considered as a major authority in the artistic universe. His bibliography is very important (references in all important libraries, not only in European countries but all around the world). A lot of books and works, particularly about Miró and Dalí, have really established his fame. But it seems that his life is not very well known.

References

1914 births
2002 deaths
People from Alt Empordà
Spanish art critics
Spanish translators
Translators from Catalonia
20th-century Spanish writers
University of Valladolid alumni
Catalan–Spanish translators
English–Spanish translators
French–Spanish translators
Translators to Catalan
20th-century translators